Colors II is the tenth studio album by American progressive metal band Between the Buried and Me. It was released on August 20, 2021 through Sumerian Records, their second release with the label, after the two-part album Automata I and II. It serves as a direct follow-up to their 2007 album Colors.

Background
In regards of the conception of the album, vocalist Tommy Giles Rogers, Jr. explained:

Guitarist Paul Waggoner added:

Concept
About the concept, Rogers commented:

And about the track "Fix the Error", he shared:

Release and promotion
The first single "Fix the Error" was released on June 25, 2021. An animated music video was released for the song on July 7, 2021, animated by Tony Celano. The second single "Revolution in Limbo" was released on July 23, 2021. A music video for "The Future Is Behind Us" was released on August 20, 2021, the same date as the album release.

Critical reception

The album received generally positive reviews from music critics upon its release. On review aggregator Metacritic, the album holds a score of 68 out of 100 based on four reviews.

Kerrang! gave the album 4 out of 5 with writer James Hickie stating: "Unsurprisingly, at 80 minutes long, and with exhaustive closing track 'Human Is Hell (Another One with Love)' taking up 15 of those, it's entirely too much music to wrestle with on cursory listens, and requires serious dedication, though that's no bad thing in an age when streaming has fundamentally altered the attention span. As a result, the uninitiated are likely to be overwhelmed by such a glut of material, particularly when it takes so many stylistic detours and about-turns. It's worth the endeavour, though, because there's some sublime music here, deep and diverse, which has plenty to offer nerds and newbies alike."

Metal Hammer gave the album a positive review, stating: "In being so loyal to the structure of what's come before, Colors II doesn't reinvent progressive metal like its predecessor, but by all other metrics, it lives up to its lineage. It's the only album to ever recapture Colors brand of restlessness, reaffirming that BTBAM are once-in-a-lifetime masterminds."

Accolades

Track listing

Personnel
Credits for Colors II adapted from liner notes.

Between the Buried and Me
 Tommy Giles Rogers Jr. – vocals, keyboards
 Paul Waggoner – lead guitar
 Dustie Waring – rhythm guitar
 Dan Briggs – bass, keyboards
 Blake Richardson – drums, harsh vocals on "Revolution in Limbo"

Additional musicians
 Mike Portnoy (ex-Dream Theater) – first drum solo on "Fix the Error"
 Navene Koperweis (Entheos) – second drum solo on "Fix the Error"
 Ken Schalk (ex-Candiria) – third drum solo on "Fix the Error"

Production
 Jamie King – production, engineering
 Jens Bogren – mixing
 Richardo Borges – mixing
 Tony Lindgren – mastering
 Corey Meyers – photography, layout, design
 Jason Prushko – engineering
 Thomas Cuce – engineering
 Aaron Strelecki – photography

Charts

References

2021 albums
Between the Buried and Me albums
Sumerian Records albums
Concept albums
Albums produced by Jamie King (record producer)
Sequel albums